This is a list of Time Team episodes from series 1.

Episode

Series 1

Episode # refers to the air date order. The Time Team Specials are aired in between regular episodes, but are omitted from this list. Regular contributors on the Time Team include Tony Robinson (presenter), Mick Aston, Phil Harding, Carenza Lewis, Victor Ambrus (illustrator), Robin Bush (historian) and John Gater (geophysicist).

References
General

Specific

External links
Time Team at Channel4.com
The Unofficial Time Team site Fan site

Time Team (Series 01)
1994 British television seasons